Ladies' Man is a 1931 American pre-Code drama film directed by Lothar Mendes, starring William Powell, Kay Francis and Carole Lombard. It was released on May 9, 1931 by Paramount.

Plot
A gigolo's career is threatened when the daughter of one of his clients becomes attracted to him.

Cast
William Powell as Jamie Darricott
Kay Francis as Norma Page
Carole Lombard as Rachel Fendley
Gilbert Emery as Horace Fendley
Olive Tell as Mrs. Fendley

References

External links

 

1931 films
1931 drama films
American black-and-white films
Paramount Pictures films
Films with screenplays by Herman J. Mankiewicz
American drama films
Films with screenplays by Rupert Hughes
1930s English-language films
1930s American films